Holmes wrecker may refer to:

 a recovery vehicle invented by Ernest Holmes Sr.
 a tow truck brand owned by Miller Industries